The rusty-bellied brushfinch (Atlapetes nationi) is a species of bird in the family Passerellidae.

It is endemic to Peru. Its natural habitats are subtropical or tropical moist montane forest and subtropical or tropical high-altitude shrubland.

References

External links

 
 BirdLife Especies, Technical sheet.

rusty-bellied brushfinch
Birds of the Peruvian Andes
Endemic birds of Peru
rusty-bellied brushfinch
rusty-bellied brushfinch
Taxonomy articles created by Polbot